James Fitzgerald Jones (born February 20, 1964) is an American men's college basketball coach who is the head coach at Yale University.

Born in Long Island, Jones played college basketball at SUNY Albany and worked as a sales executive for NCR Corporation before beginning his coaching career. Jones succeeded Dick Kuchen as the 22nd men's basketball head coach of Yale University on April 27, 1999. On March 17, 2016, Jones and the Bulldogs upset the fifth-seeded Baylor University Bears in the first round of the 2016 NCAA Division I men's basketball tournament.

Five of Jones' assistants have gone on to become head coaches: Ted Hotaling (University of New Haven), Rob Senderoff (Kent State University), Isaiah Cavaco (Oberlin College), Mark Sembrowich (Academy of Art University), and Mark Gilbride (Clarkson University).

His brother, Joe Jones, is the current men's basketball head coach at Boston University and was previously the men's basketball head coach at Columbia University.

Head coaching record

References

External links 
 Yale biography of Jones

1964 births
Living people
20th-century African-American sportspeople
21st-century African-American people
African-American basketball coaches
African-American basketball players
Albany Great Danes men's basketball coaches
Albany Great Danes men's basketball players
American men's basketball coaches
American men's basketball players
Basketball coaches from New York (state)
Basketball players from New York (state)
College men's basketball head coaches in the United States
Ohio Bobcats men's basketball coaches
People from Long Island
Yale Bulldogs men's basketball coaches